First-seeded René Lacoste defeated Bill Tilden 6–4, 4–6, 5–7, 6–3, 11–9 in the final to win the men's singles tennis title at the 1927 French Championships. The draw consisted of 75 player of which 16 were seeded.

Seeds
The seeded players are listed below. René Lacoste is the champion; others show the round in which they were eliminated.

  René Lacoste (champion)
  Henri Cochet (semifinals)
  Bill Tilden (finalist)
  Jean Borotra (fourth round)
  Frank Hunter (third round)
  Louis Raymond (quarterfinals)
  Béla von Kehrling (fourth round)
  Jacques Brugnon (quarterfinals)
  Nicolas Mishu (fourth round)
  Otto Froitzheim (quarterfinals)
  Sri Krishna Prasada (fourth round)
  Keats Lester (fourth round)
  Patrick Spence (semifinals)
  Charles F. Aeschliman (fourth round)
  Hendrik Timmer (fourth round)
  Stanisław Czetwertyński (fourth round)

Draw

Key
 Q = Qualifier
 WC = Wild card
 LL = Lucky loser
 r = Retired

Finals

Earlier rounds

Section 1

Section 2

Section 3

Section 4

Section 5

Section 6

Section 7

Section 8

References

External links
 

French Championships - Men's Singles
1927